The Count of the Székelys was the leader of the Hungarian-speaking Székelys in Transylvania, in the medieval Kingdom of Hungary. First mentioned in royal charters of the 13th century, the counts were the highest-ranking royal officials in Székely Land. From around 1320 to the second half of the 15th century, the counts' jurisdiction included four Transylvanian Saxon districts, in addition to the seven Székely seats (or administrative units).

The counts also held important castles outside the territories under their administration, including their seat at Görgény (now Gurghiu in Romania). They were the supreme commanders of the Székely troops; their military campaigns against Bulgaria and the Golden Horde were mentioned in royal charters and medieval chronicles. The counts presided over the general assemblies of both the individual Székely seats and the entire Székely community. They also heard appeals of the decisions of the supreme court of Székely Land.

Beginning in the late 14th century, Hungarian monarchs appointed two or three noblemen to jointly hold the office. From the 1440s, at least one of these joint holders was also regularly made Voivode of Transylvania, because frequent Ottoman raids against Transylvania required the centralization of the military command of the province. The offices of the count and the voivode were in practice united after 1467. From the late 16th century, the princes of Transylvania (as successors to the voivodes) also styled themselves as counts of the Székelys. After the integration of the principality with the Habsburg Empire, in the early 18th century, the title was in abeyance until Maria Theresa revived it at the Székelys' request. She and her successors on the Hungarian throne used the title until 1918.

Origins 

The origin of the office is obscure. The Hungarian-speaking Székelys were a "well organized community of warriors" in the medieval Kingdom of Hungary. They originally lived in scattered groups along the frontiers of the kingdom. In Transylvania, they first settled along the rivers Kézd (Saschiz), Orbó (Gârbova), and Sebes (Sebeș), but started to migrate to the easternmost region of the province when the ancestors of the Transylvanian Saxons began to arrive around 1150.

Bishop Otto of Freising mentioned that "two counts" commanded the archers in the vanguard of the Hungarian army in the Battle of the Fischa, in 1146. The Hungarian chronicles recorded that Székelys and Pechenegs formed the vanguard of the Hungarian army in that battle, thus the bishop's report may contain the first reference to a count of the Székelys, according to Attila Zsoldos, Gyula Kristó, and other historians. On the other hand, as historian Zoltán Kordé emphasizes, 13th-century royal charters mentioned other royal officials who ruled Székely groups, suggesting that the office had not been established in the previous century. For instance, a royal charter tells of an army of Saxon, Vlach, Székely, and Pecheneg troops fighting in Bulgaria under the command of Joachim, Count of Hermannstadt (now Sibiu in Romania), in the early 1210s.

The earliest royal charter mentioning a "count and commander of the Székelys" was issued in 1235. It refers to a military campaign launched against Bulgaria in 1228. Thus, the office must have existed in that year at the latest, but the count was not the sole ruler of all Székelys for decades after. For instance, a diploma of Béla IV of Hungary refers to the count of the Székelys of Nagyváty in Baranya County. Lack Hermán, who held the office from 1328 to 1343, was styled as "count of the three clans of the Székelys"; but the exact meaning of the title is unknown.

Functions 

The Székelys were organized into special administrative units (originally known as "lands", "districts", "communities" or "universities") in Transylvania. These units were known as "seats" beginning in the second half of the 14th century. Székely Land was divided into seven seats. Udvarhelyszék, Marosszék, Csíkszék, Kézdiszék, Orbaiszék, and Sepsiszék formed a contiguous territory in south-eastern Transylvania; Aranyosszék was located apart from them in the central region.

The jurisdiction of the counts was not limited to Székely Land. The Saxon district of Mediasch (now Mediaș in Romania) was subject to them until Sigismund of Luxemburg, King of Hungary, exempted the inhabitants from the counts' authority in 1402. The counts were almost continuously also the rulers of the Saxons of Bistritz (present-day Bistrița in Romania) from 1320. This district was granted to John Hunyadi by Ladislaus V of Hungary in 1453. The Saxons of Kronstadt and Burzenland (now Brașov and Țara Bârsei in Romania) were also under the jurisdiction of the counts from 1344 until the mid-15th century.

The counts held one of the most important honors in the Kingdom of Hungary. The system of honors allowed a great officer of the realm to enjoy all royal revenues connected to his office. The fines imposed in the Székely seats were to be paid to the counts. Each seat was also required to give a horse to the new count at his installation. The counts also received the royal revenues from the Saxon territories under their jurisdiction. However, most of their revenues came from the estates attached to the royal castles that they held outside Székely Land. The counts kept the right of possession of these royal castles after most high officers of the realm had lost such rights around 1402. The counts most frequently held court in the castle of Görgény, in Torda County (at present-day Gurghiu in Romania). The castle was first mentioned as being in the counts' possession in 1358. It was granted to Hunyadi in 1453. The castle of Höltövény in Alsó-Fehér County (now Hălchiu in Romania) was first mentioned as the counts' honor in 1335. The counts also seized the castles of Törcsvár and Királykő in Felső-Fehér County (now Bran Castle and Oratea Fortress in Romania), the latter being listed among the castles held by Hunyadi's sons in 1457.

The counts were the supreme commanders of the Székely troops. They were responsible for the regular supervision of the Székely warriors' military equipment. Bogomer, the first known count, was captured during a military campaign in Bulgaria in 1228. Lack Hermán, who held the office from 1328 to 1343, also styled himself the commander of the royal army stationed between the rivers Rába and Rábca during a campaign against Austria in 1336. Andrew Lackfi and his Székely troops inflicted a crushing defeat on the Tatars of the Golden Horde in early February 1345. The counts Michael Jakcs and Henry Tamási helped the Hungarian noblemen against rebellious Transylvanian peasants in 1437 and 1438. They commanded the Székely army in the first battle against the peasants at Bábolna (now Bobâlna in Romania) in the summer of 1437. They signed the agreement between the leaders of the noblemen, the Saxons, and the Székelys that declared their "Brotherly Union" against their enemies on 16 September.

The counts had important judicial functions in Székely Land and the Saxon districts subject to them. They headed the general assemblies of each Székely seat and the entire Székely community. Such an assembly was first recorded in 1344. Thereafter, the assemblies developed into important forums for the administration of justice. Lack Hermán was mentioned as the "judge of the Székelys" in the first half of the 14th century, evidence that the counts had acquired significant judicial authority by that time. The medieval judicial system of Székely Land is poorly documented. Available data suggests that the court of Udvarhelyszék was an appellate court, hearing appeals of the decisions of the courts of other seats. Appeals of the decisions of the court of Udvarhelyszék were heard by the count. The courts of justice in the seats were initially presided over by elected officials, the seat judge, and the captain. New officials, known as royal judges, appear in the sources in the 1420s. Appointed by the count, royal judges supervised the activities of the elected officials.

Monarchs and counts 

The counts represented the kings of Hungary in the territories under their jurisdiction and were independent of the voivodes of Transylvania. This separation of the two offices helped preserve the Székelys' special legal status. However, the kings never appointed a Székely to the office, which they tended to give to a kinsman of the voivode. The counts were regarded as barons of the realm, although they were not listed among the great officers in royal charters.

Ladislaus Kán took control of the whole of Transylvania after the death of Andrew III of Hungary in 1301. During the ensuing interregnum, Kán also usurped the administration of Székely Land. Royal authority was restored only after his death in about 1315. In that year, Charles I of Hungary made the brothers Thomas and Stephen Losonci counts. Their successor, Simon Kacsics, was dismissed in 1327 or 1328, because he had committed "serious crimes", according to a contemporaneous royal charter. Thereafter, the office was almost continuously held by the Lackfis for about 50 years.

The Lackfis and their immediate successors were the kings' loyal supporters, but Sigismund of Luxemburg appointed close allies of John Kanizsai, Archbishop of Esztergom, to the office, for helping him seize the throne in 1387. Sigismund strengthened his position after he punished a rebellion by Kanizsai and his allies in 1403. Thereafter, he regularly appointed two noblemen to jointly hold the office. The 15th-century counts rarely visited Transylvania, and their deputies, the vice-counts, took over much of the performance of their duties. The existence of new officials (known as "governors", "captains", or "supreme captains of the Székelys") among the Székelys in this period is also documented, but their duties cannot be determined.

End of the office 

The Ottomans made a series of plundering raids against Transylvania in the 1420s and 1430s, which led to better coordination of the defense of the province. Wladislas I, who was elected King of Hungary over the minor Ladislaus the Posthumous in 1440, decided to centralize the command of the southern border of Hungary. After his two principal military commanders, John Hunyadi and Nicholas Újlaki, annihilated the army of Ladislaus's supporters in early 1441, Wladislas made them joint voivodes of Transylvania and counts of the Székelys. This was the first occasion that the offices of voivode and count were conferred upon the same persons.

The unification of the two offices lasted for decades. Initially, between 1446 and 1467, two or three noblemen were jointly made voivodes and counts, and some of them occasionally held both offices. The two offices were in practice united after the death of John Daróci in 1467. Thereafter, the same person was made voivode and count until 1504; furthermore, the offices of vice-voivode and vice-count were also unified. A decree of 1498 still separately obliged the voivode and the count to muster troops; but after 1507, no separate counts were appointed.

The title of count was continuously used by the voivodes, and later by the princes of Transylvania, for almost two centuries. After the integration of the Principality of Transylvania into the Habsburg Empire in the late 17th century, the Habsburg monarchs did not style themselves counts of the Székelys. The title was revived at the Székelys' request by Maria Theresa. Thereafter, all kings of Hungary used the title.

List of counts

Thirteenth century

Fourteenth century

Fifteenth century

Sixteenth century

See also 
History of the Székely people
Judge of the Cumans

References

Sources 

 
 
 
 
 
 
 
 
 
 
 
 
 

 
History